Ammonifex degensii  is a Gram-negative bacterium from the genus of Ammonifex which has been isolated from a volcanic hot spring  from the Kawah Candradimuka crater, Dieng Plateau, Java, Indonesia.

References

 

Thermoanaerobacterales
Bacteria described in 1996
Thermophiles
Anaerobes